Jody Gladding (born 1955 York, Pennsylvania) is an American translator and poet. She was selected by James Dickey for the Yale Series of Younger Poets.

Life 
She graduated from Franklin & Marshall College, and Cornell University.
Gladding, who also teaches in the MFA in Writing Program at Vermont College, is the author of four books of poetry, one of which is a letterpress edition and one of which is a chapbook.  She also has been involved in two performance/installations in collaboration with fellow poet and friend Suzanne Heyd. She has received numerous prizes, fellowships and awards for both her poetry and her translations.

Her poems have recently appeared in these journals: Agni, Chicago Review, ecopoetics, Grand Street, Hunger Mountain, Northern Woodlands, Orion, Paris Review, Ploughshares, Poetry, Terra Nova, Wild Earth, Wilderness Magazine, Yale Review.

Works
  Blue Willow, On the Verge: Emerging Poets and Artists, March 1994, New Cambridge Press, Poetry 180, Library of Congress
 Two Poems, Paris Review, Number 134, Spring 1995
 The Two Houses, Yale Review, January 1997
 Blue Willow; Indian Paint;  Silver Queen;  Uncle,  AGNI 37, Boston University
 Beam; Shells,  AGNI 45, Boston University
 Aunt Peter, AGNI 56, Boston University, 2002

Books
 
 The Moon Rose, (Chester Creek Press, 2006), with accompanying woodcuts by Susan Walp.
  a chapbook

Translations
 François Cheng, The Way of Beauty (Inner Traditions, 2009)
 Hervé This, The Science of the Oven (Columbia University Press, 2009)
 Michel Pastoureau, Black: History of a Color (Princeton University Press, 2008)
 Pierre Michon, Small Lives (Archipelago, 2008) , winner of the 2009 French-American Foundation Translation Prize
 Hervé This, Kitchen Mysteries (Columbia University Press, 2007)
 Natalie Rigal, Winning the Food Fight (Healing Arts Press, 2006)
 Madeleine Ferrières, Sacred Cow, Mad Cow (Columbia University Press, 2006)
 Jean Giono, The Serpent of Stars (Archipelago, 2004), finalist for the 2004 French–American Foundation Translation Prize
 François Weil, A History of New York (Columbia University Press, 2004)
 Sylviane Agacinski, Time Passing, (Columbia University Press, 2003)
 J.-R. Pitte, French Gastronomy (Columbia University Press, 2002)
 Pierre Moinot, As Night Follows Day, (Welcome Rain, 2001)
 Michel Pastoureau, The Devil’s Cloth, (Columbia University Press, 2001)
 Jean Markale, The Epics of Celtic Ireland (Inner Traditions, 2000)
 D. Alexandre-Bidon, Children in the Middle Ages (University of Notre-Dame Press, 1999)
 Jean Markale, The Great Goddess (Inner Traditions, 1999)
 Gilbert Dahan, The Christian Polemic Against the Jews in the Middle Ages (University of Notre-Dame Press, 1998)
 Pierre Mabille, Mirror of the Marvelous (Inner Traditions, 1998)
 Daniel Odier, Tantric Quest (Inner Traditions, 1997)

Ploughshares
 Anger (Ira), Ploughshares, Winter 1997-98
 Squash (Cucurbite) , Ploughshares, Winter 1997-98
 Sweet Apples (Poma Mala Dulcia), Ploughshares, Winter 1997-98

Fellowships and awards
 French-American Foundation Translation Prize, 2009, for Small Lives
 Resident Poet at The Frost Place in Franconia, NH, 2007
 Centre National du Livre de France Translation Grant, 2007
 French-American Foundation Prize Finalist, 2004, for Serpent of Stars
 Whiting Award, 1997
 Yale Series of Younger Poets Award, 1992, for Stone Crop
 Wallace Stegner Fellowship in Creative Writing; Stanford University, 1982–83
 Graduate Fellowship in Creative Writing; Cornell University, 1979–80

References

External links
 Official website
SMALL PRESS SPOTLIGHT: JODY GLADDING, Book Critics circle, 8/08/2008
Reading Schedule, Milkweed Editions
Why I Love Slate, Montpelier’s Kellogg-Hubbard Library, Montpelier, Vermont
Website of the MFA in Writing program at Vermont College of Fine Arts in Montpelier, Vermont
Profile at The Whiting Foundation

Living people
American translators
Vermont College of Fine Arts faculty
Place of birth missing (living people)
French–English translators
American women poets
Chapbook writers
1955 births
American women academics
21st-century American women